Richard Groos (died 1407), of Wells, Somerset, was an English politician.

Family
Groos was married to a woman named Agnes and they had two sons. After Groos' death, Agnes married Luke Wilton.

Career
He was a Member (MP) of the Parliament of England for Wells in January 1404.

References

14th-century births
1407 deaths
English MPs January 1404
People from Somerset